Bazougers is a commune in the Mayenne department in northwestern France.

Population

See also
Communes of Mayenne

References

Communes of Mayenne